The NCHA Horse Hall of Fame was established by the National Cutting Horse Association (NCHA) to recognize the accomplishments of outstanding cutting horses based on their lifetime earnings in NCHA approved championship cutting horse competition.  Initially, when a horse had won $35,000 in NCHA Open Championship competition, a Gold certificate was issued to the owner of the horse, and a plaque in recognition of that achievement was mounted on a designated wall inside NCHA headquarters.  As purses and divisions grew over the years, the following amendments were made to the earnings requirement for a horse to qualify: 
1980 amended to $50,000
1981 amended to $100,000
1985 amended to $150,000
1989 amended to $200,000
1991 amended to $150,000

In addition to their Horse Hall of Fame, the NCHA established the following: NCHA Members Hall of Fame, Non-Pro Hall of Fame, NCHA Rider Hall of Fame, Youth Hall of Fame and Horse of the Year.

Hall of Fame honorees
S=stallion; M=mare; G=gelding

References

National Cutting Horse Association
Lists of horses
Equestrian museums in the United States
Halls of fame in Texas